William III of Baux (died 1257) was a son of William II of Baux.  Following his father and grandfather, William III carried the title of prince of Orange.  The title had come to the House of Baux through a brother, Raimbaut of Orange, of William III's paternal great-grandmother, Tiburge de Sarenom, the latter also referred to as Tiburge princess of Orange.

References

1257 deaths
House of Baux
Princes of Orange
Year of birth unknown